The Rural Municipality of Happyland No. 231 is a rural municipality (RM) in the Canadian province of Saskatchewan within Census Division No. 8 and  Division No. 3. Located in the southwest portion of the province, it is adjacent to the Alberta boundary and south of the South Saskatchewan River.

History 
On January 1, 1913, the RM of Happyland No. 231 became a rural municipality. It was originally named the RM of Prussia No. 231 but its name was changed sometime during 1917, at the height of the First World War and anti-German sentiment in Saskatchewan.

Geography

Communities and localities 
The following urban municipalities are surrounded by the RM.

Towns
Leader

Villages
Mendham
Prelate

The following unincorporated communities are within the RM.

Localities
Liebenthal

Demographics 

Government 
The RM of Happyland No. 231 is governed by an elected municipal council and an appointed administrator that meets on the second Tuesday of every month. The reeve of the RM is Timothy Geiger while its administrator is Kim Lacelle. The RM's office is located in Leader.

Transportation 
Rail
 Great Sandhills Railway (a Leader-to-Swift Current branch line)

Roads
Highway 21—serves Leader, Liebenthal
Highway 32—serves Leader, Prelate
Highway 321—serves Liebenthal

References 

H